Brown Sauce was a pop band, made up of presenters from the television programme, Multi-Coloured Swap Shop. These were Keith Chegwin, Maggie Philbin and Noel Edmonds. They formed for a one-off single in late 1981 called "I Wanna Be a Winner". After that became a hit, they released another in 1982, Spring Has Sprung, but failed to make an impact.

Background
The trio had been presenting the Saturday morning programme Multi-Coloured Swap Shop together since 1978. In late 1981 they decided to release a single as a novelty one-off. The song "I Wanna Be a Winner" was written by B. A. Robertson and became a surprise hit, reaching No. 15 in the UK Singles Chart in January 1982. The song remained on the UK chart for 12 weeks. The group also recorded a video. The song referenced many famous names of the time such as Diana, Princess of Wales, Frank Bough, Barbara Woodhouse and Kevin Keegan. The song was mainly performed by Chegwin and Philbin who jointly shared lead vocals. Neither Philbin nor Edmonds had any musical background, although Chegwin had performed in bands in the early 1970s. The video depicted Chegwin and Philbin playing guitars and Edmonds playing drums, although they did not play these instruments on the recording.

The B-side of the single was "Hello Hello" – the theme music of the TV programme's final series. Due to the success of the single, a follow-up was released called "Spring Has Sprung" in March 1982 under a new name, The Saucers (this time without Edmonds). This failed to enter the charts and the group went no further. This was also the month that the TV show itself ended, with Chegwin and Philbin performing "Spring Has Sprung" on the last edition.

During an interview at Live 8 in 2005, Noel Edmonds made mention of the group, saying that they scored a Top 20 hit and performed on Top of the Pops.

Discography

Singles
 "I Wanna Be a Winner" - December 1981 (UK #15) BBC Records
 "Spring Has Sprung" - March 1982 BBC Records

References

English pop music groups
British musical trios
Musical groups established in 1981
Musical groups disestablished in 1982
BBC Records artists